Egerukhay is a rural locality (an aul) in Egerukhayskoye Rural Settlement of Koshekhablsky District, Adygea, Russia. The population of this aul was 1,635 as of 2018. There are 21 streets.

Geography 
The aul is located on the left bank of the Laba River, 20 km northwest of Koshekhabl (the district's administrative centre) by road. Luchezarny is the nearest rural locality.

Ethnicity 
The aul is inhabited by Adyghes or Circassians.

References 

Rural localities in Koshekhablsky District